A total solar eclipse occurred on September 21, 1941. A solar eclipse occurs when the Moon passes between Earth and the Sun, thereby totally or partly obscuring the image of the Sun for a viewer on Earth. A total solar eclipse occurs when the Moon's apparent diameter is larger than the Sun's, blocking all direct sunlight, turning day into darkness. Totality occurs in a narrow path across Earth's surface, with the partial solar eclipse visible over a surrounding region thousands of kilometres wide.
The path of totality crossed the Soviet Union (today's Russia, Kazakhstan and Kyrgyzstan), China, Taiwan, Okinawa Prefecture and South Seas Mandate (the parts now belonging to Northern Mariana and Marshall Islands) in Japan, and ended in the Pacific ocean.

Related eclipses

Solar eclipses of 1939–1942

Saros 143

References

External links

The Total Solar Eclipse of September 21, 1941
Solar eclipse of September 21, 1941 
Eclipse catalog

1941 09 21
1941 in science
1941 09 21
September 1941 events